Karstein Seland (5 January 1912 – 13 January 2005) was a Norwegian politician for the Centre Party.

He was born in Gyland.

He was elected to the Norwegian Parliament from Hedmark in 1965, and was re-elected on one occasion. He had previously served in the position of deputy representative during the term 1961–1965, during which he briefly replaced Karen Grønn-Hagen who was appointed to the short-lived cabinet of John Lyng.

Seland was involved in local politics in Vinger and Kongsvinger municipalities between 1958 and 1967.

References

1912 births
2005 deaths
Members of the Storting
Centre Party (Norway) politicians
20th-century Norwegian politicians